Flintside is an unincorporated community in Sumter County, in the U.S. state of Georgia.

History
A post office called Flintside was established in 1924, and remained in operation until 1935. The community was named from its location on the Flint River. A variant name was "Huguenin".

References

Unincorporated communities in Sumter County, Georgia
Unincorporated communities in Georgia (U.S. state)